Francisco Miguel Rocha Dias Fernandes (born 8 April 1994 in Landim - Vila Nova de Famalicão) aka Chico, is a Portuguese footballer who plays for C.D. Trofense  as a  midfielder.

Football career
On 10 May 2014, Chico made his professional debut with Trofense in a 2013–14 Segunda Liga match against Chaves.

References

External links
 
Stats and profile at LPFP 

1994 births
Living people
Portuguese footballers
Association football midfielders
Liga Portugal 2 players
C.D. Trofense players